The Marine Pavilion was an elite hotel in Far Rockaway, Queens, which was credited with introducing ocean bathing to New York City, United States. The Pavilion, which was built on the former homestead of Rockaway's first white settler, Richard Cornell, was completed in 1833, at a then-record cost of $43,000. The hotel attracted people such as Henry Wadsworth Longfellow and Washington Irving, and other New York City literary figures and socialites who were first attracted to the hotel as a refuge from an outbreak of cholera. The Pavilion was destroyed by fire on June 25, 1864. However, with many more hotels already built in its wake, Far Rockaway remained a fashionable resort area.

References

Further reading
Vincent F. Seyfried, The Long Island Rail Road: A Comprehensive History, Part Five, published by the author, Garden City, Long Island, 1966.

Hotels in Queens, New York
Rockaway
Rockaway, Queens
1833 establishments in New York (state)
Hotel buildings completed in 1833
Hotels established in 1833
1864 disestablishments in New York (state)
Burned hotels in the United States
Buildings and structures demolished in 1864